Frances Pemberton Dade (February 14, 1907 – January 21, 1968) was an American film and stage actress of the late 1920s and 1930s.

Family

Dade was born in 1907 to Frances Rawle Pemberton and Francis Cadwallader Dade, Jr. in Philadelphia, Pennsylvania. 
She was grandniece to Confederate General John Clifford Pemberton and first cousin to athlete Hobey Baker. She studied for one year at the School of the Theater in New York.

Career
Dade acted at the Empire Theater in Toronto in 1928 and 1929, performing in a different play each week. Her other stock theater experience came in Alabama, Michigan, and New York. She did not like performing in touring companies, saying that the experience was "like traveling in a trunk". Dade moved to Hollywood, California in the late 1920s to pursue an acting career. She first caught the attention of Samuel Goldwyn as Lorelei Lee in the touring company of Gentlemen Prefer Blondes. He gave her a contract, though she later went freelance. Her first film role was in 1928, when she had an uncredited role alongside stars Dorothy Boyd and Mabel Poulton in The Constant Nymph. She also appeared in such films as Raffles (1930) and Seed (1931).

In 1931, Dade was cast in the biggest role of her career as Lucy Weston in Dracula, which starred Bela Lugosi and Helen Chandler. The scene with Bela Lugosi hovering over her prostrate body remains an indelible part of pop culture. Dade was also the first actress to ever play the character of Lucy in a motion picture. That role would catapult her to brief notoriety, and would result in her being selected as one of thirteen WAMPAS Baby Stars, including Marian Marsh, Karen Morley, and Marion Shilling, that same year.
 
Despite her performance in Dracula, Dade's film role offers dwindled. She starred in six films in 1931, three of which were horror films. In 1932, she was featured in only one film, Big Town, and she appeared on Broadway in Collision.

Personal life and death 
Dade retired from acting and married wealthy socialite Brock Van Avery on August 12, 1932, in Philadelphia. They had a daughter. The marriage developed problems, and they were divorced in 1958. She eventually moved back home to Philadelphia, and went into nursing.

In 1967, Dade was diagnosed with cancer, after which she lived with her daughter in Plainfield, New Jersey. Dade died at Birchwood Convalescent Center in Edison, New Jersey, in 1968, at the age of 60.

Filmography

References

External links
 

Frances Dade photo's at Billy Rose Theatre collection

1907 births
1968 deaths
American silent film actresses
American film actresses
Actresses from Philadelphia
20th-century American actresses
WAMPAS Baby Stars
American stage actresses
Broadway theatre people